Second Gymnasium Osijek is a high school in Osijek, Croatia.

References

External links 
  

Education in Osijek
Gymnasiums in Croatia